The 2016–17 Nemzeti Bajnokság I (known as the K&H női kézilabda liga for sponsorship reasons) is the 66th season of the Nemzeti Bajnokság I, Hungarian premier Handball league.

Team information 

The following 14 clubs compete in the NB I during the 2016–17 season:

Personnel and kits
Following is the list of clubs competing in 2016–17 Nemzeti Bajnokság I, with their president, head coach, kit manufacturer and shirt sponsor.

Managerial changes

League table

Schedule and results

Season statistics

Top goalscorers

Attendances

Source: League matches: NB I 2016/2017

Number of teams by counties

See also
 2016–17 Magyar Kupa
 2016–17 Nemzeti Bajnokság I/B

References

External links
 Hungarian Handball Federaration 
 handball.hu

Nemzeti Bajnokság I (women's handball)
2016–17 domestic handball leagues
Nemzeti Bajnoksag I Women
2016 in women's handball
2017 in women's handball